Michael John Savage (born May 13, 1960) is an Irish-born Canadian politician, who was elected Mayor of the Halifax Regional Municipality on October 20, 2012. He previously served as a Liberal Party of Canada Member of Parliament for the riding of Dartmouth—Cole Harbour from 2004 to 2011.

Biography
Savage was born in Belfast, Northern Ireland and spent his early years in South Wales before moving to Canada at age six. Savage is the son of former Nova Scotia premier John Savage. He grew up in Dartmouth, graduating from Prince Andrew High School and Dalhousie University.

Before being elected, Savage was active in the community. He is a past president of the Heart and Stroke Foundation of Nova Scotia and was a member of the board of directors of the Heart and Stroke Foundation of Canada from 1998 to 2003. He has also supported literacy through his involvement with the Dartmouth Book and Writing Awards and the Peter Gzowski Golf Tournament for Literacy.

Savage has most recently been involved with community organizations such as Junior Achievement, the Red Cross, the Canadian National Institute for the Blind, Alderney Landing, and is a former member of the Neptune Theatre Board. He was president of the Halifax Executive Association in 1995–1996 and is a member of the Metropolitan Halifax Chamber of Commerce.

Savage has also served as General Manager of S. Cunard & Co., a home and heating retailer in Nova Scotia, and later became the director, residential/general business marketing and sales for Nova Scotia Power.

In April 2002, he joined Ray & Berndtson as vice-president of business development and senior consultant.

Political career

Savage's first attempt at elected politics was when he ran in the riding of Dartmouth in the 1997 election. He finished second behind Wendy Lill of the New Democratic Party.

Savage was elected Member of Parliament for Dartmouth—Cole Harbour in June 2004, and was re-elected in 2006. He was the critic for Human Resources Development. He has served on the House of Commons Standing Committee on Health and was chair of the Liberal Caucus Committee on Post-Secondary Education and Research during the 38th Parliament. He was also the vice-chair of the standing committee on Human Resources, Social Development and the Status of Persons with Disabilities.

He has served as president of both federal and provincial organizations and has managed campaigns at both levels.

On December 4, 2006, it was reported that Savage was considering a run for the leadership of the Nova Scotia Liberal Party. On December 19, Savage announced that he would not seek the leadership.

On May 2, 2011, Savage lost his federal seat to Robert Chisholm of the NDP.

On February 6, 2012, Savage announced that he would run for Mayor of Halifax Regional Municipality in that year's municipal elections. On October 20, 2012, Savage was elected Mayor of Halifax. He was re-elected in the 2016 election and 2020 election.

Electoral history

References

External links
 

1960 births
Liberal Party of Canada MPs
Living people
Members of the House of Commons of Canada from Nova Scotia
Politicians from Belfast
People from Dartmouth, Nova Scotia
Northern Ireland emigrants to Canada
Canadian people of Welsh descent
Dalhousie University alumni
Mayors of Halifax Regional Municipality, Nova Scotia
21st-century Canadian politicians